41st Army may refer to:

 Forty-First Army (Japan) (1944–1945), a part of the Imperial Japanese Army 
 41st Army (People's Republic of China), a former name of the 75th Group Army
 41st Army (Russia), a field army of the Russian Ground Forces

See also 
 41st Army Corps (disambiguation)
 41st Battalion (disambiguation)
 41st Brigade (disambiguation)
 41st Division (disambiguation)
 41st Regiment (disambiguation)
 41 Squadron (disambiguation)